Ricardo Jaimes Freyre (May 12, 1868 – April 24, 1933) was a Peruvian-born Bolivian poet.

Background and early years

Born in Tacna, Peru on May 12, 1868, his Symbolist-influenced verse, which frequently took advantage of free verse forms, was important in the development of Latin American modernism.

Freyre spent much of his time abroad, especially in Tucumán, Argentina, teaching literature at the Padres Lourdistas' Secondary School.

Collaboration with Rubén Darío

He founded, in collaboration with Rubén Darío the "short-lived but influential" review Revista de América.

His works were also influenced by Norse mythology.

Death

Freyre died in Banfield, Argentina on April 24, 1933.

Notes

External links
Biography and selection of poems  

 

Bolivian male poets
1868 births
1933 deaths
Foreign ministers of Bolivia
Bolivian diplomats